Pazderino is a rural locality (a village) in Frolovskoye Rural Settlement, Permsky District, Perm Krai, Russia. The population was 41 as of 2010. There are 5 streets.

Geography 
Pazderino is located 14 km southeast of Perm (the district's administrative centre) by road. Bolshaya Mos is the nearest rural locality.

References 

Rural localities in Permsky District